Odites aethiopicus is a moth in the family Depressariidae. It was described by Alexandr L. Lvovsky in 2001. It is found in Ethiopia.

References

Moths described in 2001
Odites